Mluleki Luke Nkala (born 1 April 1981) is a Zimbabwean international cricketer. He took the wicket of Sachin Tendulkar with his second ball in senior international cricket in 1999. He also took five wickets against England in a test match in Nottingham in 2000.

A member of the Zimbabwean Test and One Day International teams, Nkala also captained Zimbabwe in three Under-19 One Day Internationals in 1999–2000. He has coached at Edinburgh Cricket Club in Melbourne, Australia and in early 2010, Nkala returned to Zimbabwe to play professional cricket with the Mid-West Rhinos franchise.

References

External links

1981 births
Living people
Alumni of Falcon College
CFX Academy cricketers
Matabeleland cricketers
Zimbabwe One Day International cricketers
Zimbabwe Test cricketers
Zimbabwe Twenty20 International cricketers
Zimbabwean Under-19 ODI captains
Zimbabwean cricketers
Cricketers at the 1998 Commonwealth Games
Zimbabwean cricket commentators
Mid West Rhinos cricketers
Northern Ndebele people
Cricketers from Bulawayo
Commonwealth Games competitors for Zimbabwe